Arabella Duval Huntington (née Yarrington;  1850/1851 – September 16, 1924) was an American philanthropist and once known as the richest woman in the country. She was the force behind the art collection that is housed at the Huntington Library in California. 

She was the second wife of Collis P. Huntington, an American railway tycoon and industrialist. After his death, she married his nephew, Henry E. Huntington, also a railway magnate, and founder of the Huntington Library, Art Museum and Botanical Gardens, in San Marino, California.

Biography 
 In 1884, the widowed Arabella Yarrington married Collis P. Huntington, a wealthy industrialist, in San Francisco. She brought her son Archer to the marriage, and he was adopted by Collis Huntington. Collis died in 1900. 

In 1913 she married his widowed nephew Henry E. Huntington (1850–1927), who was also a railway magnate and influential in the Los Angeles area. He founded the Huntington Library, Art Museum and Botanical Gardens, in San Marino, California. 

Information about her early life was scarce. She was born Arabella Duval Yarrington in 1850 or 1851, probably in Richmond, Virginia (see Wark, p. 312). For the 1921 passenger list for the ship Aquitania, sailing from Cherbourg to New York, Arabella Huntington said she was born in Mobile, Alabama, on February 9, 1851. 

She moved north with a Mr. Worsham, also of Virginia, said to be married with children. He died shortly after they were married, leaving her with their young son Archer, who was born about 1870. (Some sources have suggested that the pair were never married and that she was Worsham's mistress). In 1877, she purchased some property in New York, which was later sold to John D. Rockefeller. 

In New York, she worked to care for the ailing wife of Collis P. Huntington, a wealthy industrialist and railway magnate whom she may have met in Richmond. (It has been suggested that her son Archer's biological father was Collis Huntington.) 

Collis Huntington's wife died in 1884 in New York. He married Arabella that year, in San Francisco, California. She was his second wife. After they married, he legally adopted Archer, who by then was 14 years old. When Collis Huntington died in 1900, both Arabella and Archer inherited money from him. She is said to have inherited more than $50 million.

Huntington Fund for Cancer Research
In 1902, Huntington gave $100,000 to General Memorial Hospital in memory of her husband to establish the first cancer research fund in the country, the Huntington Fund for Cancer Research. The hospital developed as the Memorial Sloan Kettering Cancer Center in New York.

In 1913, she married Henry E. Huntington, a nephew of her late husband. She was his second wife. The couple were together until her death in 1924. Both are buried on the grounds of the Huntington Library. A memorial to Arabella Huntington was installed in the west wing of the Huntington Library building. It was dedicated in 1927, the year of Henry's death.

Art collection 
Throughout her life, Huntington collected art, jewelry, antiques, and other luxury items. Her particular interests were in Old Masters, Medieval and Renaissance devotional images, and Louis XIV–Louis XV furniture and decorative arts. 

At her death, her entire fortune and collections went to her son Archer Huntington. He donated many of her paintings to the Metropolitan Museum of Art in New York City. These included two Rembrandts, a Vermeer, and several hundred other paintings, most of which had belonged to her husband Collis. The majority of the contents of her primary residence on W. 57th St., including most of the artwork, was sent to auction. Many of the family's other belongings, including clothing, furniture, tapestries, and porcelain, were bequeathed to other institutions including Yale University in New Haven, Connecticut, and the California Palace of the Legion of Honor art museum in San Francisco. 

Some items are held within the collections of the Huntington Library. These were selected for an exhibition about Arabella Huntington in the spring of 2006, entitled The Belle of San Marino. Only the small collection of Medieval and Renaissance paintings at the Huntington Library were in Arabella's own private collection. Henry Huntington purchased these after her death from an auction set up by her son Archer. 

The remainder of the objects in the 'Arabella Memorial Collection' at the Huntington were purchased after her death by Henry Huntington. They represent the types of objects she formerly owned, but are not the objects themselves.

Personal life

Archer M. Huntington 
Huntington's son Archer M. Huntington shared her love for art and culture. He was a great friend of non-profit organizations, especially museums. He was also one of the world's leading experts on Spanish poetry and was the founder of the Hispanic Society of America in New York City.

Death 
Arabella Huntington died in New York City on September 16, 1924. She is buried at the Huntington Library's Mausoleum in San Marino, California. Her husband Henry Huntington was buried there three years later after his death.

See also 
 Huntington family

References

Further reading 
Robert W. Wark. "Arabella Huntington and the Beginnings of the Art Collection." The Founding of the Henry E. Huntington Library and Art Gallery. San Marino, CA: Huntington Library, 1969.
Wilson. The Mauseoleum of Henry and Arabella Huntington. Berkeley, CA: University of California Press, 2005.

American art collectors
Museum founders
Philanthropists from California
People from Richmond, Virginia
People from the San Gabriel Valley
San Marino, California
Year of birth uncertain
1850 births
1924 deaths
American women philanthropists
People associated with the Huntington Library
Women art collectors
Burials at Woodlawn Cemetery (Bronx, New York)
Huntington family